Gastard is a village in Wiltshire, England, four miles south west of Chippenham, part of the  civil parish of the nearby town of Corsham.

The village has a pub called the Harp and Crown.

History and church

Remains of an early field system at Gastard are believed to date from the Romano-British period, and Roman jewellery has been found.

The name of the village has had several different forms over the centuries and was recorded variously as Gatesterta in 1154, Getestert in 1167, Gateherst in 1177, Gastard in 1428. In 1875 it was referred to in a directory as "Gastard (or Gustard)".

Gastard Court is a medieval manor house with 17th-century mullioned windows and buttresses.

Bath Freestone was mined at the Monk Quarry on Monk Lane, Gastard, where Forest Marble can also be seen exposed.

For Church of England purposes, Gastard is an ecclesiastical parish and has its own parish church dedicated to St John the Baptist, although now part of the united benefice of Greater Corsham and Lacock. The church, which dates from 1912, still has a morning service every Sunday.

In 1967, the village experienced a freak hailstorm, with some of the hailstones of nearly three inches in diameter.

Governance
Most significant local government functions are carried out by the Wiltshire Council unitary authority; until April 2009, Gastard was part of the district of North Wiltshire. At the parliamentary level, the village is part of the Chippenham borough constituency.

Notable people
Luce de Gast
Sir Robert Fowler, 1st Baronet

See also
List of places in Wiltshire

References

Bibliography
Bob Hayward, Where the Ladbrook flows: memories of village boyhood in Gastard, Wiltshire (1983)

External links

Villages in Wiltshire